A by-election was held in the Henty electorate in the eastern suburbs of Melbourne on 30 March 1946, following the resignation of independent MP Arthur Coles.

Background

Coles, a prominent businessman and founder of the Coles supermarket chain, had won the seat as an independent United Australia Party candidate at the 1940 federal election. The seat had been left open due to the death of incumbent MP Henry Gullett, a senior minister in the Menzies government, in the Canberra air disaster five weeks before the election.

Coles had duly joined the United Australia Party in early 1941, but resigned in August that year after Menzies was deposed as leader. He subsequently joined with another independent, Alexander Wilson, to vote down the Fadden UAP government in October 1941, installing Labor leader John Curtin as Prime Minister. He had generally been seen as sympathetic to Labor thereafter, and was re-elected in 1943 against Gullett's son, Henry "Jo" Gullett. In February, 1946, he was appointed chairman of the new Australian National Airlines Commission by Curtin's successor Ben Chifley, thus necessitating his resignation from parliament, which occurred on 12 February.

Preselection

Results

References

1946 elections in Australia
Victorian federal by-elections
1940s in Melbourne
March 1946 events in Australia